Yamata no Orochi (shortened to Orochi) was a famous eight-headed dragon in Japanese mythology. This may also refer to:

 Oroch people or Orochi, a Russian people that speak a Tungusic dialect 
 10888 Yamatano-orochi, an asteroid from the asteroid belt.
 Mitsuoka Orochi, a Japanese sports car
 Razer Orochi, a mouse by Razer
 Orochi (wrestler), masked professional wrestler in Osaka Pro Wrestling

Media
Orochi (film), 1925 Japanese film
Wanpaku Ouji no Orochi Taiji, 1963 Japanese film
Orochi (manga), 1969 manga by 	Kazuo Umezu
Yamata no Orochi no Gyakushū, 1985 Japanese film
Warriors Orochi, 2007 video game
 Warriors Orochi 2, 2008 video game
 Yamato Takeru (film), 1994 Japanese film released in some regions as Orochi, the Eight-Headed Dragon

Fictional characters
 Orochi (The King of Fighters), a character in The King of Fighters video game 
 Orochimaru, a character in the Jiraiya Gōketsu Monogatari folktale
 Orochimaru (Naruto), a character from the Naruto series 
 The character class Orochi in the videogame For Honor
 The character Orochi in the manga and anime One Piece
 The Orochi Group, a fictional corporation in the online game The Secret World